Triadodaphne is a genus of flowering plants belonging to the family Lauraceae.

Its native range is Borneo, Papuasia.

Species:
 Triadodaphne inaequitepala (Kosterm.) Kosterm. – New Guinea
 Triadodaphne myristicoides Kosterm. – Borneo
 Triadodaphne pachytepala Kosterm. – Solomon Islands

References

Lauraceae genera
Lauraceae